Limited Growth is a trance collaboration between Frederico Santini & Axel Stephenson. They had a total of eight releases in 1997 and 1998 under the label Bonzai Records. Their song No Fate reached number 2 in the Belgian charts in 1997.

References

External links
 Limited Growth at Last.fm

Belgian trance music groups
Belgian musical duos
Musical groups established in 1997